The 2020 season is Helsingin Jalkapalloklubi's 112th competitive season.

Season Events
On 9 January, Harmeet Singh left HJK by mutual consent.

On 11 January, HJK announced the signing of Rasmus Schüller on a two-year contract.

On 29 January, HJK announced the signing of Jakob Tånnander on a one-year contract, with the option of another year, from Malmö, and Ivan Ostojić from Radnički Niš on a 1+1-year contract.

On 3 February, HJK announced the signing of Papua New Guinea international forward David Browne on a one-year contract, with the option of an additional two years.

On 3 March, HJK announced that Atomu Tanaka had returned to the club after two-years playing in Japan, signing on a contract until the end of July.

On 10 March, HJK announced that youngster Jimi Tauriainen would leave the club to join Chelsea in the summer.

On 13 March, the 2020 Veikkausliiga season was delayed until June, and HJK's Quarterfinal match against KPV was postponed due to the COVID-19 pandemic.

On 6 May, the Veikkausliiga announced that the 2020 season would begin on 1 July, running until 21 November.

On 15 May, Atomu Tanaka extended his contract with HJK until the end of the 2020 season.

On 26 May, Enoch Banza extended his contract with HJK until the end of the 2021 season, before joining RoPS on loan for the season on 7 June.

On 6 June, HJK announced the signing of Hugo Keto from Brighton & Hove Albion on a contract until the end of 2021, with the option for an additional year.

On 15 June, goalkeeper Matias Niemelä left the club to join RoPS on loan for the rest of the season.

On 18 June, HJK announce the singing of Pyry Hannola from Midtjylland.

On 2 July, HJK announced that Julius Tauriainen, who had been on loan at SC Freiburg U19, was now permanently moving to the German club.

On 3 July, Roni Peiponen announced his retirement from football, whilst HJK announced the signing of Ítalo to their second team, Klubi 04.

On 20 July, Kalle Katz's loan move to RoPS was confirmed having been held up by the COVID-19 pandemic in Finland.

On 25 July, Valtteri Moren returned to HJK on a contract until the end of the 2022 season.

On 21 August, Matti Peltola signed a new contract with HJK, keeping him at the club until 2022, with the option of an additional year.

On 27 August, HJK announced the signing of Markus Halsti on a contract until the end of the season, with the option of an additional year.

On 4 September, HJK announced the signing of Joose Mäkinen on a contract until the end of the 2022 season, with the option of an additional year.

Squad

On loan

Left the club during the season

Transfers

In

 Transfers announced on the above date, being finalised on 1 January 2020.
 Transfers announced on the above date, being finalised on 1 July 2020.

Out

 Transfer announced on the above date, being finalised on 1 July 2020.

Loans out

Released

Trial

Friendlies

Competitions

Veikkausliiga

Results summary

Results by matchday

Results

Table

Finnish Cup

Sixth Round

Knockout stage

Final

Squad statistics

Appearances and goals

|-
|colspan="14"|Players from Klubi-04 who appeared:
|-
|colspan="14"|Players away from the club on loan:

|-
|colspan="14"|Players who left HJK during the season:

|}

Goal scorers

Clean sheets

Disciplinary record

Notes

References

2020
HJK